Jędrzej Kitowicz (November 25, 1728; April 3, 1804) was a Polish historian and diarist.

He was a rotmistrz of the Confederation of Bar in Greater Poland. In 1771 he joined a religious seminary, while he remained in service of the bishop of Kujawy Antoni Ostrowski (who later became the primate of Poland). In 1777 he took Holy Orders and in 1781 he became the provost of Rzeczyca where he spent the rest of his life.

He is best known as the author of two unfinished treatises. Description of Customs during the reign of August III (Opis obyczajów za panowania Augusta III, published in 1840) was an attempt to portray the culture of Poland during the first half of the 18th century. Memoires, or History of Poland (Pamiętniki, czyli Historia polska, published partially in 1840, complete edition in 1971) was a chronicle of the years 1743–1798, with special attention to the Confederation of Bar. Kitowicz's works, especially Opis obyczajów... have a significant literary and historical value, although he could not keep himself objective, speaking out against Stanisław August Poniatowski and the reformists.  He died in Rzeczyca.

References
 Literatura polska. Przewodnik encyklopedyczny, Warszawa 1984

Citations

Works cited

External links
 Works by Kitowicz at Polona, including the Pamiętniki and Opis obyczajów

1727 births
1804 deaths
18th-century Polish Roman Catholic priests
18th-century Polish historians
Polish male non-fiction writers
Bar confederates